The 2018 Rugby Europe Championship is the premier rugby union competition outside of the Six Nations Championship in Europe. This is the second season under its new format, that saw Georgia, Germany, Romania, Russia, Spain and Belgium compete for the title.

This year's edition of the Rugby Europe Championship also served as a key stage of the European region qualification process for the 2019 Rugby World Cup. The team with the best record across the 2017 and 2018 Championships qualified as Europe 1. As Georgia have already secured qualification automatically, results involving that team are discarded for the purposes of Rugby World Cup qualification.

Both the Championship and the Qualification Process were heavily affected by controversial disciplinary issues involving player eligibility and the selection of neutral officials (namely, Romanian referee Vlad Iordachescu in Belgium-Spain). In respect of matters relating to the eligibility of players, following a full review of the evidence, including statements and submissions from World Rugby, Rugby Europe, Belgium, Romania, Spain and Russia, the independent committee found:
 Belgium had fielded one or more ineligible players on 7 occasions during the 2017 and 2018 Rugby Europe Championships (of which 6 matches related to Rugby World Cup 2019 qualifying); 
 Romania has fielded one ineligible player on 8 occasions during the 2017 and 2018 Rugby Europe Championships (of which 6 matches related to Rugby World Cup 2019 qualifying);
 Spain had fielded one or more ineligible players on 9 occasions during the 2017 and 2018 Rugby Europe Championships (of which 8 matches related to Rugby World Cup 2019 qualifying).

In respect of sanctions, pursuant to Regulation 18, the independent committee determined the following:

The deduction of 5 points for any match in which a union fielded an ineligible player. in practice this meant the following

 40-point deduction for Spain
 30-point deduction for Belgium;
 30-point deduction for Romania.

Therefore, based on a re-modelling of the Rugby Europe Championship tables in the context of Rugby World Cup 2019 qualifying, Russia would qualify as Europe 1 into Pool A replacing Romania and Germany will replace Spain in the European play-off against Portugal.

Georgia's victory in the 2018 Rugby Europe Championship itself was unaffected. Germany's proposed promotion/relegation play-off with Portugal, however, becomes a Romania-Portugal play-off. Ironically, Germany would now face Portugal in the Rugby World Cup European qualification play-off.

Table

Fixtures

Week 1

Week 2

Week 3

Week 4

Week 5

Relegation/promotion play-off

See also 
 Rugby Europe International Championships
 2017–18 Rugby Europe International Championships
 2019 Rugby World Cup – Europe qualification
 Six Nations Championship
 Antim Cup

References

External links
 Rugby Europe official website

2017-18
2017–18 Rugby Europe International Championships
2017–18 in Belgian rugby union
2017–18 in Spanish rugby union
2017–18 in German rugby union
2018 in Russian rugby union
2018 in Georgian sport
2017–18 in Romanian rugby union
Rugby Europe
Rugby Europe